The men's C-1 500 metres competition in canoeing at the 2008 Summer Olympics took place at the Shunyi Olympic Rowing-Canoeing Park in Beijing.  The C-1 event is raced in single-man sprint canoes. This would be the last time the event would take place at the Summer Olympics. On 13 August 2009, it was announced by the International Canoe Federation that the men's 500 m events would be replaced by 200 m events at the 2012 Summer Olympics with one of them being K-1 200 m for the women. The other events for men at 200 m will be C-1, C-2, and K-1.

Competition consists of three rounds: the heats, the semifinals, and the final. All boats compete in the heats. The top finisher in each of the three heats advances directly to the final, while the next six finishers (places 2 through 7) in each heat move on to the semifinals. The top three finishers in each of the two semifinals join the heats winners in the final.

Heats took place on August 19, semifinals on August 21, and finals on August 23.

Schedule
All times are China Standard Time (UTC+8)

Medalists

Results

Heats
Qualification Rules: 1->Final, 2..7->Semifinals, Rest Out

Heat 1

Heat 2

Heat 3

Semifinals
Qualification Rules: 1..3->Final, Rest Out

Semifinal 1

Semifinal 2

Final

Opalev's gold earned him a complete set of medals in this event, having won a silver in 2000 and a bronze in 2004.

References

Sports-reference.com 2008 C-1 500 m results.
Yahoo! results on C-1 500 m heats. - accessed August 19, 2008.
Yahoo! August 21, 2008 sprint semifinal results. - accessed August 21, 2008.
Yahoo! August 23, 2008 sprint final results. - accessed August 23, 2008.
YouTube.com showing of the final. - accessed 13 August 2009.

Men's C-1 500
Men's events at the 2008 Summer Olympics